Xin Pi (before 191 -  235), courtesy name Zuozhi, was an official of the state of Cao Wei during the Three Kingdoms period of China. Along with his elder brother Xin Ping, he started his career in the late Eastern Han dynasty as an adviser to the warlord Yuan Shao. Following Yuan Shao's death and a power struggle between Yuan Shao's sons Yuan Tan and Yuan Shang, Xin Pi initially sided with Yuan Tan but later defected to Yuan Shao's rival Cao Cao, while seeking Cao Cao's aid on Yuan Tan's behalf in the fight against Yuan Shang. As a result, his family members were executed by Shen Pei, a Yuan Shang loyalist who blamed Xin Pi for the downfall of the Yuan family. After avenging his family, Xin Pi served as an official under Cao Cao, who controlled the Han central government and the figurehead Emperor Xian. After the Cao Wei state replaced the Eastern Han dynasty, Xin Pi continued serving under Cao Cao's successor Cao Pi, the first Wei emperor, and later under Cao Rui, Cao Pi's son. Throughout his service in Wei, he was known for being outspoken and critical whenever he disagreed with the emperors and his colleagues. His highest appointment in the Wei government was the Minister of the Guards. He died around 235 and was survived by his son Xin Chang and daughter Xin Xianying.

Family background
Xin Pi was from Yangzhai County, Yingchuan Commandery, which is around present-day Yuzhou, Henan. His ancestors were actually from Longxi Commandery (隴西郡; around present-day Dingxi, Gansu), but they migrated to Yingchuan Commandery during the Jianwu era (25–56 CE) of the reign of Emperor Guangwu in the early Eastern Han dynasty.

Service under Yuan Shao and Yuan Tan
Xin Pi and his elder brother Xin Ping served as advisers to the warlord Yuan Shao, who controlled much of northern China from 191 to 202. When the warlord Cao Cao, who was also Yuan Shao's rival, held the position of Minister of Works in the Han central government between 196 and 208, he invited Xin Pi to serve in his administration but Xin Pi refused.

Following Yuan Shao's death in 202, internal conflict broke out between his sons Yuan Shang and Yuan Tan over the succession to their father's place. Yuan Shao's followers also split into two camps – one supporting Yuan Shang and the other backing Yuan Tan. In 203, when Yuan Shang attacked Yuan Tan at Pingyuan County, Guo Tu advised Yuan Tan to make peace with Cao Cao and ally with Cao Cao to counter Yuan Shang. After Yuan Tan reluctantly agreed, Guo Tu nominated Xin Pi to serve as Yuan Tan's representative to meet Cao Cao.

Persuading Cao Cao to ally with Yuan Tan against Yuan Shang
Around the time, Cao Cao was planning for an invasion of Jing Province (covering present-day Hubei and Hunan) and had stationed his troops at Xiping County (西平縣; southeast of present-day Wuyang County, Henan). When Xin Pi met Cao Cao, he conveyed Yuan Tan's message and sought Cao Cao's support in dealing with Yuan Shang. Although Cao Cao was initially pleased to hear that Yuan Tan wanted to ally with him against Yuan Shang, a few days later he changed his mind and wanted to attack Jing Province first. He also hoped that in doing so, the Yuan brothers would continue to fight each other.

Some days later, when Xin Pi attended a feast hosted by Cao Cao, he noticed that Cao Cao had changed his mind after observing his facial expressions, so he spoke to Cao Cao's adviser Guo Jia. After Guo Jia told him, Cao Cao asked Xin Pi: "Can Yuan Tan be trusted? Can Yuan Shang be defeated?" Xin Pi replied: 

Cao Cao agreed with what Xin Pi said and promised to help Yuan Tan. He then led his forces to Liyang (黎陽; present-day Xun County, Henan).

Service under Cao Cao

Battle of Ye

In 204, Xin Pi accompanied Cao Cao on a campaign against Yuan Shang. Earlier on, when conflict first broke out between Yuan Shang and Yuan Tan, Xin Pi decided to side with Yuan Tan and follow him to Pingyuan County but he left his family members behind in Ye (in present-day Handan, Hebei). Yuan Shang later had Xin Pi's family members arrested and imprisoned. During the Battle of Ye, when Yuan Shang's adviser Shen Pei saw that Cao Cao's forces had broken through Ye's defences, he blamed Xin Pi for the downfall of the Yuan family so he ordered his men to execute Xin Pi's family members. After Ye fell to Cao Cao's forces, Xin Pi rushed to the prison to free his family but it was too late as all of them were already dead.

After the battle, Xin Pi found Shen Pei, who was being escorted as a captive to be brought before Cao Cao. He started hitting Shen Pei on the head with his horse whip while scolding him: "Slave, today you shall meet your doom!" Shen Pei looked at Xin Pi and replied: "You dog! It is because of you that Cao Cao conquered Ji Province. I can't wait to kill you, but too bad it turns out that today I am at your mercy." After Cao Cao met Shen Pei, he considered releasing Shen Pei but Xin Pi started crying and insisting that he wanted Shen Pei dead as justice for his family, so Cao Cao had no choice but to order Shen Pei's execution.

After the Battle of Ye, Cao Cao recommended the Han central government to appoint Xin Pi as a Consultant.

Hanzhong Campaign

In 217, when Cao Cao ordered his general Cao Hong to lead troops to attack Liu Bei's forces at Xiabian County (下辨縣; northwest of present-day Cheng County, Gansu), he also appointed Xin Pi and Cao Xiu to serve as Cao Hong's deputies. Cao Cao also issued a memo to them as follows: "In the past, when Emperor Gaozu indulged in luxury and women, Zhang Liang and Chen Ping were there to point out his mistakes. Today, Zuozhi and Wenlie will ensure that (Cao Hong) will not be careless."

After Xin Pi returned from the campaign, he was appointed as the Chief Clerk to the Imperial Chancellor, the position held by Cao Cao in the Han central government.

Service under Cao Pi
After Cao Cao died in early 220, his son Cao Pi usurped the throne from Emperor Xian later that year, ended the Eastern Han dynasty, and established the Cao Wei state with himself as the new emperor. After Cao Pi took the throne, he appointed Xin Pi as a Palace Attendant and awarded him the peerage of a Secondary Marquis.

Advising Cao Pi against changing the starting date of the calendar year
At the time, there was a discussion in Cao Pi's imperial court on the issue of whether to change the starting date of the calendar year. Xin Pi argued that it was unnecessary to do so since there was a peaceful transition from the Eastern Han dynasty to the Cao Wei state, just like how Yu succeeded Shun in ancient times. He pointed out that the ruling dynasty only changed the starting date when it replaced its predecessor through violence, such as the Shang dynasty replacing the Xia dynasty and the Zhou dynasty replacing the Shang dynasty in turn. He also quoted sayings from Confucius and the Zuo zhuan which mentioned that the starting date of the calendar year set in the Xia dynasty was the most legitimate one, and therefore it would be best for the Cao Wei state to follow it. Cao Pi heeded Xin Pi's suggestion.

Advising Cao Pi against relocating residents from Hebei to Henan
On one occasion, Cao Pi considered relocating 100,000 households from Ji Province (present-day Hebei) to the lands south of the Yellow River in present-day Henan. At the time, the people were suffering from famine as locust swarms had destroyed their crops. Although his officials strongly objected to the relocation, Cao Pi was bent on proceeding with his plan.

When Xin Pi and other officials requested an audience with him, Cao Pi knew that they were going to dissuade him from relocating the households, so he put on a stern face when he met them. While the others became afraid upon seeing the emperor's facial expression and did not dare to speak up, Xin Pi asked: "How did Your Majesty come up with the idea of relocating those households?" Cao Pi asked him in return: "Do you think it is inappropriate?" Xin Pi replied: "Indeed. I do believe it is inappropriate." Cao Pi then said: "I am not going to discuss it with you."

Xin Pi said: "Your Majesty doesn't think I am incapable. That is why you appoint me as a close aide and adviser. Why then wouldn't you discuss it with me? I am not speaking up because it is a private matter to me, but because it is an issue of concern to the state. Why do you need to get angry at me?"

When Cao Pi ignored him and walked back to his personal chambers, Xin Pi followed him and held on to his sleeve. Cao Pi became so annoyed that he forcefully pulled Xin Pi's hand off his sleeve and retreated into his chambers. When he came out later after a long time, he asked Xin Pi: "Zuozhi, what made you so impatient just now?" Xin Pi replied: "If Your Majesty relocates those households, you will lose the people's hearts. Besides, they are already suffering from famine." Cao Pi eventually did relocate those households but only 50,000 instead of 100,000.

Speaking up against Cao Pi's hunting of pheasants
On another occasion, when Xin Pi accompanied Cao Pi on a pheasant hunting trip, the emperor remarked: "What a joy it is to hunt pheasants!" Xin Pi responded: "Your Majesty may see it as a joy, but your subjects see it as a pain." Cao Pi became unhappy and hardly went out hunting again from then on.

Advising Cao Pi against attacking Eastern Wu

In 223, during the Battle of Jiangling between Wei and its rival state Eastern Wu, Xin Pi served as a military adviser to the Wei general Cao Zhen. After he returned from the battle, Cao Pi elevated him from the status of a secondary marquis to a village marquis under the title "Marquis of Guangping Village".

When Cao Pi later planned to launch a large-scale invasion of Wu, Xin Pi attempted to dissuade him by saying: 

Cao Pi asked: "If we follow what you said, does that mean that we will have to leave it to our descendants to eliminate our enemies?" Xin Pi replied: "In the past, King Wen of Zhou knew that the time wasn't ripe yet, so he left it to his son King Wu of Zhou to eliminate King Zhou of Shang. If the time isn't ripe yet, I don't see why we shouldn't wait!"

Cao Pi did not heed Xin Pi's advice and went ahead with leading his troops to attack Wu. However, he ultimately aborted the campaign and retreated after reaching the northern banks of the Yangtze River.

Service under Cao Rui
Following Cao Pi's death in 226, his son Cao Rui succeeded him as the emperor of Wei. After his coronation, Cao Rui promoted Xin Pi from a village marquis to a district marquis under the title "Marquis of Ying District" and awarded him a marquisate comprising 300 taxable households.

Tense relations with Liu Fang and Sun Zi
At the time, there were two Wei officials – Liu Fang and Sun Zi – who wielded much influence in the central government as they were highly trusted by Cao Rui. Many other officials tried to curry favour with them so that it would be beneficial to their careers. Only Xin Pi refused to have any dealings with the two of them.

Xin Pi's son, Xin Chang, urged his father: "Liu Fang and Sun Zi are highly influential in the government. Everyone can't wait to get into their good books. I think you could lower yourself a little and try to get along well with them, or else they might slander you."

Xin Pi sternly replied: 

Some time later, an official Bi Gui submitted a memorial to Cao Rui as follows: "Wang Si (王思), the Supervisor of the Masters of Writing, is a diligent and accomplished senior official. However, he is not as good as Xin Pi in virtue and strategy. I recommend Xin Pi to replace Wang Si." After reading Bi Gui's memorial, Cao Rui sought Liu Fang and Sun Zi's opinions. They said: "Your Majesty chose Wang Si because you saw that he is a practical and hardworking person who doesn't care how others see him. Xin Pi may have a good and virtuous reputation, but he is too straightforward and domineering. Your Majesty should carefully consider this issue again." Cao Rui eventually did not replace Wang Si with Xin Pi, and instead promoted Xin Pi to serve as Minister of the Guards.

Advising Cao Rui against his construction projects
During his reign, Cao Rui started labour-intensive extravagant palace construction/renovation projects which took a heavy toll on the common people, who were recruited as labourers for the projects. Xin Pi wrote a memorial to urge Cao Rui to stop the projects: 

Cao Rui replied: "By working on these projects while Eastern Wu and Shu Han have yet to be vanquished, I am providing opportunities for outspoken and fame-seeking people to voice their opinions. It should be the collective responsibility of the people to construct and maintain the imperial capital of the Empire. By building a grander imperial capital now, I am actually helping to reduce the burden on future generations. This was the most basic approach that Xiao He adopted when he oversaw the construction of the imperial capital of the Han dynasty. You, as an important figure in the imperial court, should know this very well."

Cao Rui also wanted to flatten the top of Mount Mangdang (芒碭山; located north of present-day Yongcheng, Henan) and build a terrace on it so that he could view Meng Ford (孟津; present-day Mengjin County, Henan) from there.

When Xin Pi heard about it, he wrote to the emperor: "Heaven and Earth are meant to be as they are. If the land is high, then it should be high; if the land is low, then it should remain low. Attempting to modify the geography will not only be going against nature, but also a waste of manpower and resources, as well as a heavy burden on the people. Besides, if we turn the hills and mountains into flat lands, we will have no natural barriers to protect us when the river floods." Cao Rui heeded Xin Pi's advice and dropped his idea.

Response to Zhang He's death
In 231, after the Wei general Zhang He was killed in an ambush while pursuing Shu forces after the Battle of Mount Qi, Cao Rui lamented his death and told all his officials: "We lost Zhang He before we even conquer Shu. What will become of my generals?" Chen Qun remarked: "Zhang He was indeed a great general. He was a pillar of our state."

Although Xin Pi agreed that Zhang He's death was a huge loss for Wei, he believed that, on the inside, the Wei forces should not feel demoralised and, on the outside, show their enemy that they had become weaker without Zhang He. He rebuked Chen Qun: "Lord Chen, how can you say this? Towards the end of the Jian'an era, when everyone said the Empire couldn't do without Emperor Wu, the ruling dynasty still changed and Emperor Wen received the Mandate of Heaven. During the Huangchu era, everyone also said that we couldn't do without Emperor Wen, but he still passed away and His Majesty came to the throne. Surely, the Empire has more talents than just one Zhang He."

Chen Qun replied: "What Xin Pi said is also true." An amused Cao Rui quipped: "Lord Chen, you are really good at changing your stance."

The fifth-century historian Pei Songzhi argued that Xin Pi made an inappropriate comparison between Zhang He and the Wei emperors because generals and emperors were of different social status and hence should not be seen in the same light. In Pei Songzhi's opinion, Xin Pi should have instead compared Zhang He with other Wei generals such as Zhang Liao. He also pointed out the comparison did not reflect well on Xin Pi, who was known for being outspoken and upright, because he came close to degrading the status of the Wei emperors by making such a comparison.

Battle of Wuzhang Plains

In 234, the Battle of Wuzhang Plains took place between Wei and Shu forces, who were respectively led by Sima Yi and Zhuge Liang. When the situation came to a stalemate, Sima Yi, who held the position of General-in-Chief, wrote to Cao Rui to seek permission to engage the enemy. Cao Rui denied him permission. Later, as the stalemate dragged on, Cao Rui became worried that Sima Yi would defy orders and attack the enemy, so he appointed Xin Pi as military adviser to the General-in-Chief, granted him an imperial sceptre (a symbol of the emperor's authority), and sent him to the frontline to ensure that Sima Yi followed orders and stayed in camp. Xin Pi carried out his task well, and no one dared to disobey him.

The Weilue recorded that Sima Yi wanted to order his troops to attack after the Shu forces goaded and provoked him numerous times. However, Xin Pi used the imperial sceptre to order them to remain in camp and refrain from engaging the enemy. Although Sima Yi was unhappy about it, he had no choice but to defer to Xin Pi.

After Zhuge Liang died of illness during the standoff, Xin Pi was recalled back to serve as Minister of the Guards again in the central government.

Death
Xin Pi died on an unknown date but the Australian sinologist Rafe de Crespigny estimated that he died around 235. The Wei government honoured him with the posthumous title "Marquis Su", which means "serious marquis".

Descendants
Xin Pi's son, Xin Chang, had the courtesy name Taiyong. He inherited his father's peerage as the Marquis of Ying District and served as an official in the Wei government. He rose to the position of Administrator of Henei Commandery (河內郡; around present-day Jiaozuo, Henan) during the Xianxi era (264–265). The Shiyu recorded that he later became the Minister of the Guards like his father.

Xin Pi also had a daughter, Xin Xianying, who married Yang Dan.

See also
 Lists of people of the Three Kingdoms

Notes

References

 Chen, Shou (3rd century). Records of the Three Kingdoms (Sanguozhi).
 
 Pei, Songzhi (5th century). Annotations to Records of the Three Kingdoms (Sanguozhi zhu).
 

2nd-century births
235 deaths
Officials under Yuan Shao
Cao Wei politicians
Officials under Cao Cao
Politicians from Xuchang
Han dynasty politicians from Henan